Aaron Samuel ben Israel Kaidanover (1614 in Vilna – 1 December 1676 in Chmielnik; Hebrew: אהרן שמואל קאידנוור) was a Polish-Lithuanian rabbi. Among his teachers were Jacob Hoeschel and his son Joshua Hoeschel.

Biography
During the Khmelnytsky Uprising (1648–1649) the Cossacks plundered Kaidanover's possessions, his valuable library and his manuscripts among them, and killed his two young daughters. He arrived in Moravia an impoverished fugitive. He was elected rabbi successively of Langenlois in Lower Austria, Nikolsburg, Glogau, Fürth, and Frankfurt am Main, and then returned to Poland in 1671 to become the rabbi of Cracow, a position he held until his death on 1 December 1676, while attending the Vaad HaGalil of Krakow that took place in Chmielnik (Michael; but Azulai and Horovitz give 1679; see bibliography). 

Kaidenvoer was opposed to the use of shulchan aruch and its commentaries in deciding Jewish law and instead supported the use of Arbah Turim with commentary of the Beis Yosef, going so far as to tell (letter found in the Responsa Nachlas Shiva) a rabbi to sell all of his books and buy himself a set of Arbah Turim. 

Kaidanover's son Tzvi Hirsch, was a rabbi at Frankfurt and author of Kav Hayashar. He printed much of his father's works.

Works
He wrote:
 Birkat ha-Zebaḥ, annotations to the Talmudical tractates of Kodashim (except Hullin and Bekorot), with a preface in which he narrated the remarkable events of his life (edited by his son-in-law Nahum Kohen, brother of Shabbethai Kohen (ש"ך), Amsterdam, 1669; another edition, with the commentary Omer Man, appeared [at Berlin?] in 1773).
 Birkat Shemuel, derashot on the Pentateuch, partly kabbalistic, with additions by his son Zevi Hirsch, its editor (Frankfort-on-the-Main, 1682)
 Emunat Shemuel, sixty responsa on matrimonial cases, edited by his son (ib. 1683)
 Tiferet Shemuel, novellæ to various Talmudic tractates, also edited by his son (ib. 1692). The annotations to Hoshen Mishpat contained in the last-named work were printed in Ture Zahav (Hamburg, 1692).

Jewish Encyclopedia bibliography
Azulai, Shem ha-Gedolim, i. 124b, Warsaw, 1876;
Benjacob, Oẓar ha-Sefarim, pp. 41, 87, 88, 659;
Jacob Emden, Megillat Sefer, p. 5, Warsaw, 1896;
Fürst, Bibl. Jud. i. 201, ii. 200;
Grätz, Gesch. x. 81;
Horovitz, Frankfurter Rabbinen, ii. 49-53, 99;
Kaufmann, Vertreibung der Juden aus Wien, p. 62, note 6, Vienna, 1889;
Michael, Or ha-Ḥayyim, No. 317;
Steinschneider, Cat. Bodl. cols. 772, 886.

References

References

17th-century Polish–Lithuanian rabbis
Rabbis from Vilnius
1614 births
1676 deaths